Bettwiller is a commune in the Bas-Rhin department in Grand Est in northeastern France.

Population

See also
Communes of the Bas-Rhin department

References

Communes of Bas-Rhin